Lahoriye is a 2017 Indian-Punjabi drama film written and directed by Amberdeep Singh. It stars Amrinder Gill, Sargun Mehta, Yuvraj Hans, Nimrat Khaira, Sardar Sohi and Guggu Gill.

Lahoriye is about the effects of the partition of India on Punjab. The movie deals with the modern India and how two people of different religions and countries begin to love each other and come together by connecting their values of the same culture as Punjabis. The film grossed over $1.5 million in three territories, in its opening weekend. The film grossed over ₹7.25 crore net in India, in its first week.

Plot 
Lahoriye is an emotional drama that mostly revolves around two central characters: Kikkar Singh (Amrinder Gill) – a Sikh man from a border town village in Punjab, India; and Ameeran Khan (Sargun Mehta) – a Muslim woman from Lahore, Punjab, Pakistan.

In present-day Punjab, India; Kikkar Singh, while working in his field one day, sees Ameeran on the other side of the Indo-Pak border and falls in love with her. He then visits her in Lahore, Punjab, Pakistan, but before he actually meets her, he is intercepted by Naseem Khan (Yuvraj Hans) – the son of the landlord of Ameeran. Kikkar Singh convinces Naseem Khan of his true and honest love for Ameeran Khan, and subsequently Naseem Khan himself helps Kikkar Singh to meet Ameeran at a family function. Both confess their love to each other and decide to get married. Naseem Khan vows that he would help them in every possible way he could. Later on, Naseem Khan falls in love with Harleen Kaur, Kikkar Singh's sister (Nimrat Khaira).

Although both Kikkar Singh's and Ameeran Khan's family agree to their marriage initially, but due to certain misunderstandings later on, their marriage is called off. The rest of the movie traces the events that affect not just Kikkar Singh and Ameeran Khan, but two old friends who got separated during the partition of India. Then in the climax, the family members realize that Kikkar Singh and Ameeran Khan truly love each other . Then Kikkar is married to Ameeran and Naseem is married to Harleen.

Cast 
 Amrinder Gill as Kikkar Singh
 Sargun Mehta as Ameeran Khan
 Yuvraj Hans as Naseem Khan (Ameeran’s landlord’s son)
 Nimrat Khaira as Harleen Kaur (Kikkar's  cousin)
 Sardar Sohi as Harbans Singh (Kikkar's father)
 Guggu Gill as Zorawar Singh
 Nirmal Rishi as Tejparkash Kaur (Kikkar's mother)
 Hobby Dhaliwal as Chaudhary (Naseem's father)
 Rajiv Thakur as Kikkar's friend
 Amberdeep Singh as Taufiq (cameo appearance)
 Sandeep Malhi as Ameeran's sis-in-law
 Gagan Mehra as Gagandeep

Track list

Awards and nominations

Notes

References

External links 
 Lahoriye Official Trailer
 

India–Pakistan relations in popular culture
Films set in Lahore
Punjabi-language Indian films
2010s Punjabi-language films
Films set in Punjab, India
Films scored by Jatinder Shah
Indian interfaith romance films